Francheville may refer to the following places:

 in France:
 Francheville, Côte-d'Or, in the Côte-d'Or département
 Francheville, Eure, in the Eure département 
 Francheville, Jura, in the Jura département
 Francheville, Marne, in the Marne département
 Francheville, Meurthe-et-Moselle, in the Meurthe-et-Moselle département 
 Francheville, Orne, in the Orne département 
 Francheville, Rhône, in the Rhône département 
 La Francheville, in the Ardennes Department
 in Canada:
 Francheville (census division), a statistical area in Quebec.
 Francheville Regional County Municipality, a former regional county municipality in Quebec.